Benezette, also known as Benezett, is an unincorporated community in Elk County, Pennsylvania, United States. Benezette has a post office with ZIP code 15821.

References

Unincorporated communities in Elk County, Pennsylvania
Unincorporated communities in Pennsylvania